PTX, Vol. III (Volume 3) is the fourth extended play album by the a cappella group Pentatonix. It was released on September 23, 2014 by RCA Records, although it was released earlier in Australia on September 19, 2014. The extended play contains four covers as well as three original tracks ("On My Way Home", "See Through" and "Standing By"). As of October 23, 2015, PTX, Vol. III has sold 201,226 copies.

Background
In April and May 2014 during their European tour, Pentatonix began working on PTX Vol. III. Since they weren't always in one place at a time, the album was recorded at various tour locations such as Singapore, New York City and Japan.  The arrangement and recording process in the album was different to those of previous albums as the songs were pre-arranged and the outline of the song was created before its details were filled in.
The song "On My Way Home" was originally written by the British alternative rock band Coldplay for their seventh studio album, A Head Full of Dreams, was given to Pentatonix and left off the final track list.

Track listing

Charts

Release history

Personnel

Pentatonix
 Mitch Grassi – tenor lead and backing vocals, rapping on "Problem"
 Scott Hoying – baritone lead and backing vocals, vocal bass and bass backing vocals on "Standing By"
 Kirstin Maldonado – alto lead and backing vocals
 Avi Kaplan – vocal bass, bass lead and backing vocals
 Kevin Olusola – vocal percussion, cello on "Papaoutai", rapping on "Problem"

Additional personnel
 Lindsey Stirling – violin on "Papaoutai"
 Ben Bram – production

References

A cappella albums
Pentatonix EPs
2014 EPs
RCA Records EPs
Covers albums
Sequel albums